Jo Yong-son (born 23 June 1970) is a North Korean wrestler. He competed in the men's freestyle 63 kg at the 2000 Summer Olympics.

References

 

1970 births
Living people
North Korean male sport wrestlers
Olympic wrestlers of North Korea
Wrestlers at the 2000 Summer Olympics
Place of birth missing (living people)
21st-century North Korean people